The 2012 Elite League speedway season (also known as the Sky Sports Elite League for sponsorship reasons) was the 78th season of the top division of UK speedway and took place between March and October 2012.

Summary
The Poole Pirates were the defending champions after winning in 2011. Poole nearly repeated the success of the previous season but fell just short. They topped the regular season table for the third year running and won the Knockout Cup for the third year running but lost in the play off final to Swindon Robins. Darcy Ward and Chris Holder were exceptional for the Pirates again but Swindon's triumph (their first since 1967) was put down to a group of riders all maintaining consistent scores. They were Danes Hans Andersen and Peter Kildemand, Australians Troy Batchelor, Nick Morris and Jason Doyle (the latter recruited from Poole) and Sheffield born Simon Stead.

Lakeside Hammers and British speedway was rocked by the news that one of their leading riders Lee Richardson had been killed in a race at the Olympic Stadium in Wrocław, Poland on 13 May. The Hammers did well to finish in a play off place without their main heat leader. Richardson was the 1999 World Under-21 champion and a leading British international. Richardson died of injuries he suffered after touching the wheels of the rider just in front and being thrown into the fence. In recent years fatal accidents had become less frequent and this accident highlighted the dangers still involved in the sport. In part the accident was the catalyst for the decision to make air fences mandatory at tracks the following season.

League table

Home: 3W = Home win by 7 points or more; 2W = Home win by between 1 and 6 points 
Away: 4W = Away win by 7 points or more; 3W = Away win by between 1 and 6 points; 1L = Away loss by 6 points or less
M = Meetings; D = Draws; L = Losses; F = Race points for; A = Race points against; +/- = Race points difference; Pts = Total Points

Championship play-offs

Semi-finals

Leg 1

Leg 2

Grand final

First leg

Second leg

The Swindon Robins were declared Elite League Champions, winning on aggregate 95-89.

Elite League Knockout Cup
The 2012 Elite League Knockout Cup was the 74th edition of the Knockout Cup for tier one teams. Poole Pirates were the winners of the competition for the third consecutive year. The Knockout Cup was then suspended for four years until it was held again under the new name 2017 SGB Premiership Team KO Cup.

Quarter-finals

Semi-finals

Final

The Poole Pirates were declared Knockout Cup Champions, winning on aggregate 102-78.

Leading averages

Riders & averages
Belle Vue

 7.59
 7.51
 7.49
 5.68
 5.47
 5.18
 5.09
 4.88
 4.87
 2.97

Birmingham

 7.84
 7.68
 7.29
 7.18 
 6.63
 6.26
 4.63
 2.06

Coventry

 8.59 
 8.54
 7.19
 6.87
 6.27
 6.03
 5.42
 4.61
 4.60
 4.00

Eastbourne

 8.00
 7.29
 7.09
 6.95
 6.59 
 6.51
 5.58

King's Lynn

 9.51
 7.24
 6.97
 6.79
 6.23
 6.05
 5.96
 5.76
 5.68

Lakeside

 8.76
 8.74
 8.33
 6.94
 6.21
 5.89
 5.67
 5.12
 5.12
 4.00

Peterborough

 8.55 
 8.29
 7.42
 7.19
 7.18
 5.42
 5.16
 4.21

Poole

 10.90 
 10.31 
 10.18 
 8.08
 6.58
 4.34
 4.29
 4.25
 3.87
 3.62
 3.17

Swindon

 8.95 
 8.41 
 7.97
 7.89
 6.79
 6.42
 5.83
 5.52

Wolverhampton

 9.09
 9.08 
 7.04
 6.34
 6.28
 5.83
 3.66
 2.64
 1.27

See also
 List of United Kingdom Speedway League Champions
 Knockout Cup (speedway)

References

SGB Premiership
Elite League
Speedway Elite